Ridings Mill is an unincorporated community in southern Frederick County, Virginia. Ridings Mill takes its name from the mill on West Run there. The community is located to the east of Middletown at the crossroads of Ridings Mill and Huttle Roads.  Named for the mill located on West Run on Ridings Mill Road, this is a rural area consisting mainly of farms.

References

Unincorporated communities in Frederick County, Virginia
Unincorporated communities in Virginia